Bhabha University is a private university in Bhopal, Madhya Pradesh, India. It was established in 2018 by the Ayushmati Education and Social Society.

References

External links
 

Private universities in India
Educational institutions established in 2018
2018 establishments in Madhya Pradesh